Paterna de Rivera is a small town located in the province of Cádiz, Spain. According to the 2005 census, it had a population of 5,354.

Demographics

References

External links
Paterna de Rivera - Sistema de Información Multiterritorial de Andalucía

Municipalities of the Province of Cádiz